The enzyme guanosine-3′,5′-bis(diphosphate) 3′-diphosphatase (EC 3.1.7.2) catalyzes the reaction 

guanosine 3′,5′-bis(diphosphate) + H2O  GDP + diphosphate

This enzyme belongs to the family of hydrolases, specifically those acting on diphosphoric monoester bonds.  The systematic name is guanosine-3′,5′-bis(diphosphate) 3′-diphosphohydrolase. Other names in common use include guanosine-3′,5′-bis(diphosphate) 3′-pyrophosphatase, PpGpp-3'-pyrophosphohydrolase, and PpGpp phosphohydrolase.  This enzyme participates in purine metabolism.

Structural studies

As of late 2007, only one structure has been solved for this class of enzymes, with the PDB accession code .

References

EC 3.1.7
Enzymes of known structure